Howard E. Babbush (October 8, 1941 – January 16, 2004) was an American lawyer and politician from New York.

Life
Babbush was born on October 8, 1941, in Brooklyn, New York City. He attended Thomas Jefferson High School.  He graduated B.A. from Pace University, and from St. John's University School of Law in 1966. He was admitted to the bar in 1967. He married Marilyn, and they had three children.

He entered politics as a Democrat, and became first an Assistant Corporation Counsel of New York City, then an Assistant U.S. Attorney for the Southern District of New York, and later an Assistant New York City Comptroller.

On April 27, 1976, he was elected to the New York State Assembly, to fill the vacancy caused by the appointment of A. Frederick Meyerson to the New York City Criminal Court. Babbush was re-elected several times, and remained in the Senate until 1996, sitting in the 181st, 182nd, 183rd, 184th, 185th, 186th, 187th, 188th, 189th, 190th and 191st New York State Legislatures.

On September 16, 1987, Babbush, Senate Minority Leader Manfred Ohrenstein and Ohrenstein aide Frank Sanzillo were indicted for 564 counts of grand larceny, conspiracy and several other crimes. They were accused of hiring full-time election campaign workers, in the guise of legislative aides, who were paid with money from the State Legislature. All three pleaded not guilty. Although he remained under indictment, and was re-elected several times in the meanwhile, Babbush's case never came up for trial.

In 1996, he was defeated in the Democratic primary by John L. Sampson. In November 1996, Babbush ran on the Liberal ticket for re-election, but was again defeated by Sampson.

Babbush died on January 16, 2004, while travelling in Spain.

References

1941 births
2004 deaths
Politicians from Brooklyn
Democratic Party members of the New York State Assembly
Jewish American state legislators in New York (state)
Pace University alumni
St. John's University School of Law alumni
20th-century American politicians
Thomas Jefferson High School (Brooklyn) alumni
20th-century American Jews
21st-century American Jews